Joshua Cooper (1732 – 16 December 1800) was an Irish landowner and politician from County Sligo.

Cooper was educated at Trinity College, Dublin.

He sat in the House of Commons of Ireland from 1761 to 1783, as 
a Member of Parliament (MP) for Castlebar from 1761 to 1768, and for Sligo County 1768 to 1783.
He was made a Privy Councillor in 1776 by King George III.

Cooper was the older of two sons of Joshua Cooper MP and his wife Mary, the daughter of Richard Bingham of Newbrook, County Mayo. He inherited his father's estate of Markree Castle near Collooney.
He married Alicia Synge, daughter of Edward Synge, the Bishop of Elphin. On his death, Markree passed to his oldest son Joshua Edward Cooper (–1837), who was an MP for County Sligo from 1790 to 1806. Joshua Edward became deranged by 1806, and management of Markree passed to Joshua's younger son Edward Synge Cooper (1762–1830), whose son Edward Joshua Cooper inherited Markree in 1837.

His great-grandson Edward Joshua Cooper, also an MP, was a noted astronomer who built Markree Observatory in the 1830s.

References 
 

1732 births
1800 deaths
Joshua died 1800
18th-century Irish landowners
Politicians from County Sligo
Irish MPs 1761–1768
Irish MPs 1769–1776
Irish MPs 1776–1783
Members of the Privy Council of Ireland
Members of the Parliament of Ireland (pre-1801) for County Mayo constituencies
Members of the Parliament of Ireland (pre-1801) for County Sligo constituencies
Alumni of Trinity College Dublin